The 12215 / 12216 Delhi Sarai Rohilla–Bandra Terminus Garib Rath Express is a Superfast Express train of the Garib Rath category belonging to Indian Railways – Northern Railway zone that runs between  and  in India. It has Vadodara or Ghaziabad-based WAP-5 which pulls train up to 130 kmph between Geratpur and Virar.

It operates as train number 12215 from Delhi Sarai Rohilla to Bandra Terminus and as train number 12216 in the reverse direction, serving the state of Delhi, Haryana, Rajasthan, Gujarat & Maharashtra.

When the train was introduced, it ran only up to  being subsequently extended to Delhi Sarai Rohilla.

Service

 The 12215 Delhi Sarai Rohilla–Bandra Terminus Garib Rath Express covers the distance of 1431 kilometres in 22 hours 50 mins (63 km/hr).
 The 12216 Bandra Terminus–Delhi Sarai Rohilla Garib Rath Express covers the distance of 1431 kilometres in 23 hours 30 mins (61 km/hr).

As the average speed of the train is above , as per Indian Railways rules, its fare includes a Superfast surcharge. It touches 130 kmph, with Ghaziabad or Vadodara-based WAP-7 between Geratpur and Virar

Coaches

The 12215 Delhi Sarai Rohilla–Bandra Terminus Garib Rath Express presently has 19 AC 3 tier coaches along with 2 EOG coaches. It does not have a pantry car. it has 21 coaches which is equal to Bandra Terminus–Hazrat Nizamuddin Garib Rath Express and Mumbai Rajdhani Express

As with most train services in India, coach composition may be amended at the discretion of Indian Railways, depending on demand.

COACH COMPOSITION

Route & Halts

Schedule

Traction

Gallery

References

External links

Sister trains
 August Kranti Rajdhani Express
 Bandra Terminus–Hazrat Nizamuddin Garib Rath Express
 Bandra Terminus–Hazrat Nizamuddin Yuva Express
 Lokmanya Tilak Terminus–Hazrat Nizamuddin AC Express
 Maharashtra Sampark Kranti Express
 Mumbai–New Delhi Duronto Express
 Mumbai Rajdhani Express
 Mumbai CSMT–Hazrat Nizamuddin Rajdhani Express

Delhi–Mumbai trains
Garib Rath Express trains
Rail transport in Gujarat
Rail transport in Rajasthan
Rail transport in Haryana
Railway services introduced in 2008